HDMS Havfruen was a frigate of the Royal Danish Navy.

Construction
HDMS Havfruen was built at the Royal Dock Yard in Copenhagen to a design by Andreas Schifter. She was launched on 6 October 1825.

She was one of four frigates in the same class.

Royal Danish Navy service

She served the Royal Danish Navy from 6 October 1825. She was under command of captain C. Lütken and accompanied by HDMS Nymfen from 28 April 1832 to  22 June 1832

Later captains were J. R. Petersen (26 April 1848 – 18 August 1848), J. Christmas (18 August 1848
- 14 October 1848), J. R. Petersen (17 March 1849 – 28 September 1849) and J. A. Meyer (24 May 1850 – 18 October 1850).

She was used as a naval training ship from 1 May 1853 to 1 October 1853. She was under command of captain Peter Frederik Wulff from 1 June 1853 to 7 October 1853 and then

From 1 October 1853 she was used as an accommodation ship under the command of Captain-Lieutenant E. W. Holst and again in 1854 and 1856.

Civilian service
She was decommissioned from the navy on 5 September 1864. On 13 March  1865, she was sold in auction at the Royal Dockyard. The buyer was Det Kjøbenhavnske Skibsrhederi, a subsidiary of H. Puggaard & Co. She was adapted for use as a merchant ship under the supervision of P. Brandt at the Royal Naval Dockyard in 1865–1866.

In her time as a merchant ship, Havfruen was commanded by captain J.P. Sørensen, captain A.F. Andrea, captain J.C. Trolle and captain A.J. Bang (1880-1881).

On 27 March 1882, she was sold to Johan Ingemanson, Elleholm, Blekinge, Sweden, with captain Daniel Petterson as partner. She wrecked in 1882 at Griffin Cove, Gaspe, Canada.

References

External links

 H. Puggaards Rederi - Det Kjøbenhavnske Skibsrederi af Juni 1866 I/S

Ships designed by Andreas Schifter
Frigates of the Royal Danish Navy
Sailing ships of Denmark
Ships built in Copenhagen
1825 ships